The large moth family Crambidae contains the following genera beginning with "H":

References 

 H
Crambid